In 2013, the Campeonato Brasileiro Série D, the fourth division of the Brazilian League, will be contested for the fifth time in history.
It will be contested by 40 clubs, four of which will eventually qualify to the Campeonato Brasileiro Série C to be contested in 2014.

Competition format
The 40 teams are divided in eight groups of 5, playing within them in a double round-robin format. The two best ranked in each group at the end of 10 rounds will qualify to the Second Stage, which will be played in home-and-away system. Winners advance to Third Stage. The quarterfinal winners will be promoted to the Série C 2014. As there is no Série E, or fifth division, technically there will be no relegation. However, teams who were not promoted will have to re-qualify for Série D 2014 through their respective state leagues.The competition can also be considered as 4 mini-tournaments (Group 1+2;3+4;5+6;7+8) because according to the playoff-structure, exactly one team of each "mini-tournament" will be promoted.

Participating teams

First stage

Group 1 (AC-AM-PA-RO-RR)

1 Six points deducted for use of irregular player.

Group 2 (AP-MA-PE-PI-TO)

Group 3 (CE-PE-RN)

Group 4 (AL-BA-PB-SE)

Group 5 (DF-GO-MT-MS)

Group 6 (ES-MG-RJ)

Group 7 (MG-RS-SC-SP)

Group 8 (PR-RS-SC-SP)

Final Stage

* Aparecidense was excluded by STJD, due to in the second leg against Tupi, the Aparecidense's masseuse invaded the field to save a goal at minute 89.

Finals

References

External links

2013
4